Arachnis dilecta is a moth of the family Erebidae. It was described by Jean Baptiste Boisduval in 1870. It is found in Mexico and Honduras.

References

Moths described in 1870
Spilosomina
Moths of North America